Bob Lasater is a former American football coach.  Lasater was the 13th head football coach at Dickinson State College—now known as Dickinson State University–in Dickinson, North Dakota and held that position for four seasons, from 1972 until 1975.  His coaching record at Dickinson State was 21–14–1.

Head coaching record

References

Year of birth missing (living people)
Living people
Dickinson State Blue Hawks football coaches